Tha Kham is a subdistrict municipality (thesaban tambon) in Hot District in the south of Chiang Mai Province, Thailand. It covers the district centre and headquarters, and the town is also referred to as Hot.

References

Cities and towns in Chiang Mai province